Sagarnal Union Council is a Union Parishad of Bangladesh, located in Juri Upazila, Moulvibazar District, Sylhet Division. It has an area of 29 square kilometres and a population of 34,492.

Demography 
Sagarnal has a population of 34,492.

Administration 
Sagarnal constitutes the no. 6 union council of Juri Upazila. It contains 16 villages and 14 mouzas.

The villages are as follows: Sagornal (North, South and Tea Garden), Kapna Mountain Tea Garden, Bathnighat, Baradahar (North, South, East and West), Jalalpur, Hosnabad, Birgugali, Patilashangon, Jangaliya and Kharkuna.

Economy and tourism 
Sagornal has four Haat bazaars.

Education 
The Union has a literacy rate of 70%. It has 8 government primary schools, 7 private primary schools. Sagornal High School is one of two high schools. It also has 4 junior schools. There is one madrasa which is Sagornal Senior Alim Madrasha.

Language and culture 
The native population converse in their native Sylheti dialect but can also converse in Standard Bengali. Languages such as Arabic and English are also taught in schools. The Union contains 30 mosques. They are as follows:
 Kashinagar Jame Masjid
 Batnighat Jame Masjid
 Birgugali Jame Masjid
 South Patila Shangon Jame Masjid, Patila Shongon Baytul Jannat Dorer Par Jame Masjid, Patila Shangon Chutiyabari Jame Masjid
 West Patila Shangon Jame Masjid, Patila Shangon Hatiwali Jame Masjid, Patila Shangon Jame Masjid, Patila Shangon Baytul Aman Jame Masjid
 Jangaliya Jame Masjid
 Hosnabad Jame Masjid Babusingh Gaon
 Boroitola Jame Masjid Boroituli, Boroituli Panjegana Jame Masjid
 East Baradahar Jame Masjid, South Baradahar Jame Masjid, North Baradahar Jame Masjid
 North Sagornal Tilagaon Baytus Salam Jame Masjid, North Central Sagornal Jame Masjid, North Sagornal Nalarpar Jame Masjid, North Sagornal Jurirpar Jame Masjid
 Northeast Sagornal Jame Masjid, North Sagornal Timukhi Jame Masjid, South Sagornal Jame Masjid, Southeast Sagornal Jame Masjid, 
 South Sagornal Rahmaniya Jame Masjid Kathatila, Southwest Sagornal Jame Masjid and Mazar
 Sagornal Tea Garden Jame Masjid
 Kapna Pahar Jame Masjid

It also has 5 eidgahs and they are: Sagornal Shahi Eidgah, South Sagornal Shahi Eidgah, Maqam Bari Eidgah, Batnighat Shahi Eidgah and Patilashangon Shahi Eidgah.

List of chairmen

References

Unions of Juri Upazila